Roshen Dalal (born 1952) is an Indian historian and writer of books for adults and children on the history of India and its religions. She has a PhD in Indian Ancient History. Roshen Dalal was born in Mussoorie and studied in various schools across the country. After a BA (Hons) in history from the University of Bombay, she completed an MA and PhD in Ancient Indian History from Jawaharlal Nehru University, New Delhi. She has taught at both school and university, and been involved in research in the fields of indian history, religion and philosophy, and education.She lives in Dehradun.

Life
Roshen Dalal was born in 1952 in Mussoorie, India.

Selected publications

The Puffin History of India (2 vols) Penguin Books India, 1997.
 
Hinduism: An Alphabetical Guide Penguin Books India, 2010.
 
 
The Puffin History of the World (2 vols) Penguin Books India, 2014.

References

1952 births
Living people
Indian women historians
21st-century Indian women writers
21st-century Indian writers
21st-century Indian historians
Parsi writers
Parsi people
Jawaharlal Nehru University alumni
People from Mussoorie
Scholars from Uttarakhand
Women writers from Uttarakhand